Red Lightning is a wargame created by Norm Koger and published by Strategic Simulations for the Atari ST and MS-DOS in 1989. An Amiga conversion followed a year later. The game is set in Europe and hypothesizes a Soviet invasion of Western Europe.

The Box Art for Red Lightning was created by illustrator Marc Ericksen, and features Soviet T-80 tanks, with Mig-29s flying air cover, advancing under heavy weather.

Reception
In the November 1989 edition of Games International (Issue 10), John Inglis noted that the menu driven system "can be a little tedious as it takes you many keystrokes to move you from one part to the next." However, he concluded by giving the game above average ratings of 4 out of 5 for both game play and graphics, saying, "I would [...] recommend it to traditional wargamers."  

In the January 1994 edition of Computer Gaming World, M. Evan Brooks stated that Red Lightnings user interface had "serious flaws". While the Atari ST version's mouse-driven user interface was not as flawed, Brooks concluded that "the overall ease of use is sorely lacking in what is supposed to be computer entertainment", and gave the game a poor rating of only 2 out of 5.

References

External links
Norm Koger's overview

1989 video games
Amiga games
Atari ST games
Cold War video games
DOS games
Strategic Simulations games
Computer wargames
Video games developed in the United States